This is a list of former employees of the professional wrestling promotion Major League Wrestling. Launched in 2002, Major League Wrestling would air locally in Florida and hold major shows in the style of pay-per-views which would run for two hours. After going on an extended hiatus in 2004, Major League Wrestling would run live shows featuring top independent talent worldwide beginning again in 2017 and following the success of their live shows would obtain a one-hour television show named Fusion which currently airs on BeIN Sports as well as their YouTube channel. This list is organized alphabetically by the wrestlers' real family names. In the case of wrestlers originating from Spanish-speaking countries, who most often have two surnames, the paternal (first) surname is used.

Male wrestlers

References

Former personnel
Lists of professional wrestling personnel